Cetariu is a commune in Bihor County, Crișana, Romania with a population of 2,165 people. It is composed of four villages: Cetariu, Șișterea (Siter), Șușturogi (Sitervölgy) and Tăutelec (Hegyköztóttelek). It also included three other villages until 2003, when they were split off to form Paleu Commune.

References

Communes in Bihor County
Localities in Crișana